Rasulabad (also Romanized as Rasūlābād) is a village in Masumiyeh Rural District, in the Central District of Arak County, Markazi Province, Iran. At the 2006 census, its population was 20, in 5 families.

References 

Populated places in Arak County